Cameron Dunn (born February 13, 1984 in Alta Loma, California) is an American soccer player who last played for Los Angeles Blues in the USL Professional Division.

Career

College and amateur
Dunn attended Alta Loma High School where he was a three-year letterwinner in soccer while also captaining the team both his junior and senior years. Dunn was named Mt. Baldy League MVP, and named to First Team All-CIF in his final season at Alta Loma High School.

Dunn played college soccer at NCAA Division I University of California, Irvine where he redshirted his freshman season, but played on the first team from 2003 to 2006. During the 2003, 2004 and 2005 collegiate off seasons, Dunn played for Orange County Blue Star in the USL Premier Development League, helping the team to the Southwest Division title and the National playoff semi finals in 2005.

Professional
Dunn was drafted in the 4th round (46th overall) of the 2007 MLS SuperDraft by Chivas USA. He signed as a developmental player on March 2, 2007 but was released by the team on April 12, 2007.

Dunn instead signed with expansion franchise California Victory in the USL First Division, playing ten games through the rest of the season, but Victory folded and withdrew from the league at the end of the season.

In 2008, Dunn joined Los Angeles-based amateur team Hollywood United, and helped them shock Portland Timbers in the first round of the 2008 Lamar Hunt U.S. Open Cup. Dunn also spent time training with Chivas USA and playing in three MLS Reserve Division games, scoring one goal.

On August 1, 2008, the Portland Timbers of the USL First Division signed Dunn for the remainder of the season. He was released on December 7, 2009 after spending 2 years with the club.

Having spent 2010 out of the professional game, Dunn signed with the expansion Los Angeles Blues of the new USL Professional League on January 19, 2011.

References

External links
 Portland Timbers bio

1984 births
Living people
California Victory players
Chivas USA players
Association football defenders
Hollywood United players
Orange County SC players
Orange County Blue Star players
People from Alta Loma, Rancho Cucamonga, California
Portland Timbers (2001–2010) players
Soccer players from California
Sportspeople from San Bernardino County, California
USL First Division players
USL League Two players
USL Championship players
UC Irvine Anteaters men's soccer players
Chivas USA draft picks
American soccer players